Beaumont Park may refer to:

Beaumont Park, a suburb of Huddersfield in West Yorkshire, England.
Beaumont Park, Tyne and Wear, a section of Whitley Bay, Tyne & Wear, England.
Beaumont Provincial Park, a provincial park near Fraser Lake, British Columbia, Canada.
Beaumont-Hamel Newfoundland Memorial Park, a memorial site in France dedicated to Dominion of Newfoundland forces from World War I.
Beaumont Park, a park in Oakland, California.
Beaumont Botanical Gardens, also known as Tyrell Park, in Beaumont, Texas.
Beaumont Park, a park in Greenbank, Plymouth, England. 
Beaumont Park Stadium, a speedway stadium in Leicester, England